Slavomír Kica (born 13 October 1984) is a Slovak football defender who currently plays for FK Gerlachov.

References

External links

1984 births
Living people
Slovak footballers
Association football defenders
1. FC Tatran Prešov players
Slovak Super Liga players
Partizán Bardejov players
FK Poprad players
2. Liga (Slovakia) players